Lyallpur Museum is a heritage museum in Faisalabad, Pakistan ( the old and original name for the city of Faisalabad is Lyallpur). It has 10 galleries which show the ancient and modern history and culture of Lyallpur/Faisalabad.

History
It was established in 2011 by then Chief Minister Punjab, Mian Shahbaz Sharif, following a proposal from Aamer Sarfraz. It has a Board of Governors now headed by the Commissioner, Faisalabad Division.

Galleries 
The ten galleries are:
 Orientation Gallery
 Sandal Bar Gallery
 Regional Heritage Archaeological Gallery
 Muslim to Sikh Period Gallery
 Chenab Colony Gallery
 Lyallpur Gallery
 Thought and Act Gallery
 Social Beauty Gallery
 Textile Gallery
 Pakistan Movement Gallery

Location 
Lyallpur Museum is located on University Road in front of Faisalabad District Council and close to District courts. Car access is from either Katchehry Bazaar or University of Agriculture (Faisalabad) Main Campus. Public transport system also provide access to Lyallpur Museum.

See also
List of museums in Pakistan

References

External links 
 Official website of Lyallpur Museum
 Lyallpur Museum on YouTube

Museums in Punjab, Pakistan
Culture in Faisalabad
Buildings and structures in Faisalabad
Tourist attractions in Faisalabad
Museums established in 2011
2011 establishments in Pakistan